FC Dustlik was an Uzbek football club based in Yangibozor on the collective farm of Dustlik, about 20 km from Tashkent, Tashkent Province. The club were champions of Uzbekistan twice; in 1999 and 2000.

History

Names
until 1962 – "Pakhtakor"
1963–1991 – "Politotdel" (political department)
1992 – "Politotdel-RUOR" (political department – Republican School of Olympic Reserve)
1993–1995 – "Politotdel" (political department)
1996–2003 – "Dustlik"

Domestic history

Continental history

1 FC Dustlik did not show up for the 1st leg in Dushanbe due to the civil war in Tajikistan(?); they were ejected from the competition and fined $10,000.

Honours
Uzbek League (2) 1999, 2000
Uzbek Cup (1) 2000

References

 
Association football clubs established in 1963
1963 establishments in Uzbekistan
Defunct football clubs in Uzbekistan
Association football clubs disestablished in 2003
2003 disestablishments in Uzbekistan